The Ministry of Ecology and Environment, formerly the Ministry of Environmental Protection of the People's Republic of China, and prior to 2008 known as the State Environmental Protection Administration, is a department of the State Council of the People's Republic of China. It superseded the MEP in 2018.

The Ministry is the nation's environmental protection department charged with the task of protecting China's air, water, and land from pollution and contamination. Directly under the State Council, it is empowered and required by law to implement environmental policies and enforce environmental laws and regulations. Complementing its regulatory role, it funds and organizes research and development. It also has jurisdiction over China's nuclear safety agency.

History
In 1972, Chinese representatives attended the First United Nations Conference on the Human Environment, held in Sweden. The next year, 1973, saw the establishment of the Environmental Protection Leadership Group. In 1983, the Chinese government announced that environmental protection would become a state policy. In 1998, China went through a disastrous year of serious flooding, and the Chinese government upgraded the Leading Group to a ministry-level agency, which then became the State Environmental Protection Administration.

Organization
There are 12 offices and departments under MEP, all at the si (司) level in the government ranking system. They carry out regulatory tasks in different areas and make sure that the agency is functioning accordingly:

Department structure

Leadership

Regional centers 

In 2006, SEPA opened five regional centers to help with local inspections and enforcement. Today, the five centers are direct affiliates of MEE:

Areas of activities
MEP regulates water quality, ambient air quality, solid waste, soil, noise, radioactivity. In the area of R&D activities, MEP has funded a series of "Key Laboratories" in different parts of the country, including: Laboratory for Urban Air Particles Pollution Prevention and Control for Environmental Protection, Laboratory on Environment and Health, Laboratory on Industrial Ecology, Laboratory on Wetland Ecology and Vegetation Recovery, and Laboratory on Biosafety.

In addition, MEP also administers engineering and technical research centers related to environmental protection, including: Center for Non-ferrous Metal Industrial Pollution Control, Center for Clean Coal and Ecological Recovery of Mines, Center for Industrial Waste Water Pollution Control, Center for Industrial Flue Gas Control, Center for Hazardous Waste Treatment, and Center for Solid Waste Treatment and Disposal of Mines.

China is experiencing an increase in environmental complaints: In 2005, there were 51,000 disputes over environmental pollution, according to SEPA minister Zhou Shengxian. From 2001 to 2005, Chinese environmental authorities received more than 2.53 million letters and 430,000 visits by 597,000 petitioners seeking environmental redress.

List of Ministers

See also 

 Environment of China
 China water crisis
 Ministry of Water Resources of the People's Republic of China
 Organic Food Development Center
 Ministries of the People's Republic of China
 Environmental Protection Administration (Republic of China)

References

External links 
  
  
Interview with Pan Yue

Environmental Protection
Environmental policy in China
China, Environmental Protection
China